The 1877 Iowa gubernatorial election was held on October 9, 1877. Republican nominee John H. Gear defeated Democratic nominee John P. Irish with 49.39% of the vote.

General election

Candidates
Major party candidates
John H. Gear, Republican
John P. Irish, Democratic 

Other candidates
Daniel P. Stubbs, Greenback
Elias Jessup, Prohibition

Results

References

1877
Iowa